Ann or Anne Martin may refer to:

Ann M. Martin (born 1955), American author of children's and young adult books
Ann Martin (journalist), American journalist and news anchor
Anne Martin (rower) (born 1961), American rower
Anne Henrietta Martin (1875–1951), suffragist, pacifist, and author from the U.S. state of Nevada
Bette Bright, English rock singer, born Anne Martin
Anne Martin (Gaelic singer) (born 1963)

See also
Anne-Marie Martin (born 1957), Canadian actress and writer
Lee Ann Martin, Canadian judge
Anna Martin (disambiguation)